Binibining Pilipinas 2018 was the 55th edition of Binibining Pilipinas. It took place at the Smart Araneta Coliseum in Quezon City, Metro Manila, Philippines on March 18, 2018.

At the end of the event, Rachel Peters crowned Catriona Gray as Miss Universe Philippines 2018, Maria Angelica de Leon crowned Ahtisa Manalo as Binibining Pilipinas International 2018, Chanel Olive Thomas crowned Jehza Huelar as Binibining Pilipinas Supranational 2018, Elizabeth Clenci crowned Eva Patalinjug as Binibining Pilipinas Grand International 2018, Katarina Rodriguez crowned Karen Gallman as Binibining Pilipinas Intercontinental 2018, and Nelda Ibe crowned Michele Gumabao as Binibining Pilipinas Globe 2018. Vickie Rushton was named 1st Runner-Up and Samantha Bernardo was named 2nd Runner-Up.

This pageant marks the emerald edition of the Binibining Pilipinas pageant. To mark the occasion, new crowns were designed for the incoming titleholders, and, for the first time, crowns were also awarded to the first and second runners-up.

Results
Color keys
  The contestant won in an International pageant.
  The contestant was a Finalist/Runner-up in an International pageant.
  The contestant was a Semi-Finalist in an International pageant.
  The contestant did not place.

Special awards

Judges 
 Edgar Saavedra – Megawide Construction Chairman
 Mike Brown – General Manager, Novotel Manila Araneta Center
 Gerald Anderson – actor
 Alyssa Valdez – volleyball player
 Martin Lopez – Chief Technology Officer, ABS-CBN Corporation
 Thirdy Ravena – Ateneo Blue Eagles basketball player
 H.E. Victor Hugo Echiverri – Colombian Ambassador to the Philippines
 Precious Lara Quigaman – Miss International 2005, actress
 Ces Oreña-Drilon – Head, ABS-CBN Lifestyle Ecosystem, news anchor
 H.E. Sung Kim – Chairman of the Board of Judges, United States Ambassador to the Philippines

Contestants 
40 contestants competed for the six titles.

Notes

Post-pageant notes 

 Catriona Gray competed at Miss Universe 2018 in Bangkok, Thailand and won. Karen Gallman also won when she competed at the Miss Intercontinental 2018 pageant in Manila. Gray was the fourth Miss Universe from the Philippines, while Gallman was the first Miss Intercontinental from the Philippines.
 Maria Ahtisa Manalo competed at Miss International 2018 in Tokyo, Japan where she finished as First Runner-Up. On the other hand, Jehza Huelar finished as a Top 10 finalist when she competed at Miss Supranational 2018 in Krynica-Zdrój, Poland.
 Eva Pyschee Patalinjug competed at Miss Grand International 2018 in Yangon, Myanmar but was unplaced. Patalinjug is currently the National Director of the Hiyas ng Pilipinas pageant, the first national pageant based in Cebu.
 Michele Gumabao competed at The Miss Globe 2018 pageant in Albania where she finished as a Top 15 semifinalist. She also bagged the Miss Social Media and Miss Dream Girl awards. After her stint at Binibining Pilipinas, Gumabao competed at the Miss Universe Philippines 2020 pageant representing Quezon City, and finished as Second Runner-Up.
 Maria Andrea Abesamis competed again at Binibining Pilipinas in 2019 where she finished as First Runner-Up. She then took over the Binibining Pilipinas Grand International 2019 title after the resignation of Samantha Lo. Abesamis was supposed to be the representative of the Philippines at the 2020 edition of Miss Grand International, but was not able to compete internationally due to age restrictions. Furthermore, Samantha Bernardo, Second Runner-Up at Binibining Pilipinas 2019 and candidate at Binibining Pilipinas 2021, was appointed as Binibining Pilipinas Grand International 2020 and withdrew her participation at Binibining Pilipinas 2021. Bernardo became the representative of the Philippines at the Miss Grand International 2020 pageant in Bangkok, Thailand where she finished as First Runner-Up.

References

2018
2018 beauty pageants